Joseph Bonnel (4 January 1939 – 13 February 2018) was a French football midfielder who represented France in the FIFA World Cup 1966. He scored three goals during the 1966 season.

Bonnel injured the English goalscorer Jimmy Greaves in the group stages of the 1966 World Cup, causing Greaves to require 14 stitches in his leg and miss all further appearances in the competition, including his possible appearance in the final where his replacement Geoff Hurst scored a hat-trick.

Titles
French Championship in 1971, 1972 with Olympique Marseille
Coupe de France in 1969 and 1972 with Olympique Marseille

References

External links
 Profile

1939 births
2018 deaths
French footballers
France international footballers
Association football midfielders
Montpellier HSC players
Valenciennes FC players
Olympique de Marseille players
Ligue 1 players
1966 FIFA World Cup players
French football managers
AS Béziers Hérault (football) managers
Olympique de Marseille managers
AS Béziers Hérault (football) players
Sportspeople from Hérault